Middletown is a small village and townland in County Armagh, Northern Ireland. It lies near the border with County Monaghan, between Armagh and Monaghan along the A3. It had a population of 237 people (91 households) in the 2011 Census.

Geography

Middletown was built in the townland of Middletown, which was known throughout the 17th century under variants of the name Killecannagan. It is known for its picturesque countryside and its rolling green hills. The hills are made up of numerous drumlins that make up the countryside. At the bottom of the valleys that many of these drumlins form, glens can be found with many tributaries of the River Blackwater flowing through them. The River Cor flows through the Middletown countryside and right by the village. It is the most prominent river in Middletown; once a canal system operated on it, namely the Ulster Canal.

History
Middletown was one of several Catholic border villages in Armagh that would have been transferred to the Irish Free State had the recommendations of the Irish Boundary Commission been enacted in 1925.

Education
Children from Middletown formerly went to three different primary schools: St John's Boys' School, St Louis Convent School for girls, and Glasdrummond Primary School (boys and girls). Due to low numbers in the mid-1990s, a new school was built on the site of St John's Boys' School and was opened in June 1999, whereupon all three primary schools were amalgamated.

Notable people
Joe Coburn, Irish-American boxer who claimed the World Heavyweight Championship in 1862, born Middletown
Eamon Donnelly, director of elections for Sinn Féin and a founding member of Fianna Fáil, was born in Middletown.

Sport
Middletown has a long history of Gaelic games and the local Gaelic Athletic Association club, Middletown GAA, plays hurling as Na Fianna, football as Eoghan Ruadh, and camogie as St John's.

See also
 List of villages in Northern Ireland
 Market Houses in Northern Ireland
 E2 European long distance path

References

External links

Villages in County Armagh
Townlands of County Armagh
Civil parish of Tynan